Sleep Has His House is an album by the English apocalyptic folk group Current 93, released in 2000. The album was written and recorded as a reaction to the death of David Tibet's father. It prominently features harmonium. The lyrics were mostly written by Tibet and the music composed by Michael Cashmore.  The album title was taken from a line of Confessio Amantis, by the English poet John Gower.

Critical reception
The Quietus wrote that "'The Magical Bird In The Magical Woods' is not only the best track on the record but also one of Tibet’s greatest odes, inaugurated with brooding harmonium which is the main constant on the album."

Track listing
"Love's Young Dream"  – 3:01
"Good Morning, Great Moloch"  – 3:18
"The Magical Bird in the Magical Woods"  – 8:47
"Red Hawthorn Tree"  – 4:33
"Immortal Bird"  – 6:33
"Niemandswasser"  – 6:07
"Lullaby"  - 1:43
"Sleep Has His House"  – 24:17
"The God of Sleep Has Made His House"  – 4:32

Participants
Michael Cashmore - all instruments, music (all except track 8)
David Tibet - vocals, harmonium, music (track 8), lyrics (all except track 9)
Steven Stapleton - the world, mixing
Colin Potter - engineering
Pantaleimon - help on track 3

References

External links
 

2000 albums
Current 93 albums
Durtro albums